Yeremiah Neavius Bell (born March 3, 1978) is a former American football safety who played in the National Football League (NFL). He played college football at Eastern Kentucky and was drafted by the Miami Dolphins in the sixth round of the 2003 NFL Draft.

He also played for the New York Jets and Arizona Cardinals.

Early years
Bell attended George Rogers Clark High School in Winchester, Kentucky, where he was a three-year letterman in football as a defensive back and wide receiver. He also lettered in basketball as well as in baseball, starting as a senior with former Major League pitcher Matt Ginter.

Bell was not highly recruited while in high school, and without a full scholarship offer he began doing hard labor in a central Kentucky steel mill for $8 per hour.

College career
After two years of working in the steel mill, Bell enrolled at nearby Eastern Kentucky University and attempted to walk-on the Eastern Kentucky Colonels football team. Bell made the team, but contemplated quitting during two-a-day practices his freshman year. Eventually Bell would remain on the team and excel in the defensive backfield. In his three-year college career Bell was a finalist for the 2001 Buck Buchanan Award as the Division I-AA Defensive Player of the Year. He was also named a 2001 All-American, two time All-Ohio Valley Conference safety (2000–01), and was the OVC defensive player of the year (2001). Before his senior season in 2002 Bell injured his knee in a pick-up basketball game ending his college career.

Awards and honors
 Eastern Kentucky Defensive Back of the Year (1999)
 2x All-Ohio Valley Conference (2000, 2001)
 Eastern Kentucky Defensive Most Valuable Player (2000)
 Associated Press All-American (2001)
 Ohio Valley Conference Defensive Player of the Year (2001)
 Named to the Eastern Kentucky University All-Century team as a Defensive Back (2009)

Professional career

Miami Dolphins

2003
Bell was drafted in the sixth round by the Miami Dolphins and signed to the team's practice squad.

2004
Bell played in 13 games recording 10 tackles in primarily a special teams and reserve role before suffering a broken leg late in the season.

2005
In his first injury free NFL season, Bell played in all 16 games registered 21 tackles, three sacks, an interception, four passes defensed, a fumble recovery and a forced fumble. He finished second on the squad with 14 stops on special teams, where he also recovered a fumble. The initial interception of his NFL career came vs. New England Patriots (11/13) when he picked off a Tom Brady pass in the fourth quarter, leading to a Dolphins touchdown six plays later.

2006
Bell earned a starting spot in Dolphins secondary. In his first season as a starter Bell has recorded 62 tackles, 2 sacks, and 11 passes defended. Dolphins defensive standout Jason Taylor said of Bell, "The guy just makes plays, no matter if it's special teams, defense or whatever. He always makes plays for us."

2007
In 2007 Bell was a restricted free agent and he signed a tender that he received from the Dolphins. Bell was the starter at strong safety but suffered a torn Achilles tendon in the season opener on September 9 that ended his season. He was placed on injured reserve on September 11. Bell finished the season with 5 tackles.

2008
After the 2007 season Bell became an unrestricted free agent but he did not receive much interest from other teams because of his torn Achilles tendon. The Dolphins re-signed him to a one-year, 1.4 million dollar contract on March 3. In 2008, Bell became a force to be reckoned with. He finished the season with 120 tackles, 1 sack, and three forced fumbles,  & while he did not have any picks that year, his return from injury proved to be the stabilizing force in the secondary.

2009
Miami's leading tackler in 2008, and 2009, Bell signed a four-year, $20 million contract with the Dolphins on the eve of free agency. The deal included $10 million in guaranteed money. He finished the season with 114 tackles, 1.5 sacks, and 3 interceptions. In 2009 Bell received a Pro Bowl selection after Antoine Bethea and the Indianapolis Colts went to the Super Bowl.

2010
In 2010, Bell started all 16 games, recording 101 tackles, 1.5 sacks, two forced fumbles with one recovery and one interception.

2011
After starting all games and recording 107 total tackles for the 2011 season, Bell was released after the season on March 19, 2012.

New York Jets

2012
Bell was signed by the New York Jets on May 18, 2012 to a one-year $1.4 million contract.

Arizona Cardinals

2013
Bell signed with the Arizona Cardinals on March 13, 2013.

Retirement
On August 9, 2014, Bell announced that he would be retiring from the NFL.

Personal
Bell has a daughter, Yamia, born July 23, 2000, and a son, Brayden, born December 15, 2003.

References

External links
Miami Dolphins bio
New York Jets bio
Arizona Cardinals bio

1978 births
Living people
People from Winchester, Kentucky
Players of American football from Kentucky
American football safeties
Eastern Kentucky Colonels football players
Miami Dolphins players
New York Jets players
Arizona Cardinals players
Ed Block Courage Award recipients